Minnesota State Highway 262 (MN 262) was a short highway in south-central Minnesota, which ran from its interchange with Interstate 90 in Pleasant Prairie Township; six miles east of Fairmont; and continued north to its northern terminus at its intersection with Martin County Road 53 in the town of Granada. The route was a state highway from 1949 to 2007. In the present day, the route is known as Martin County Road 53.

Route description
The route had followed Main Street in Granada and 260th Avenue outside the city.

It was legally defined as Legislative Route 262 in the Minnesota Statutes § 161.115(193).

History
Highway 262 was authorized on July 1, 1949. It was paved in 1953. The route was removed in 2007, becoming part of County Road 53.

Major intersections

References

External links

Highway 262 at the Unofficial Minnesota Highways Page

262